Sretensky (masculine), Sretenskaya (feminine), or Sretenskoye (neuter) may refer to:
Sretensky District, a district of Zabaykalsky Krai, Russia
Sretenskoye Urban Settlement, a municipal formation which the town of Sretensk and one rural locality in Sretensky District of Zabaykalsky Krai, Russia are incorporated as
Sretensky, Russia (Sretenskaya, Sretenskoye), several rural localities in Russia
Sretenskoye, Kyrgyzstan, a village in Kyrgyzstan